Assa Sasar Surekh Baai is an Indian Marathi language television series which aired on Colors Marathi. The show starred Mrunal Dusanis and Santosh Juvekar in lead roles. The series premiered from 27 July 2015 and ended on 31 March 2018.

Cast 
 Mrunal Dusanis / Sayali Patil as Jui
 Santosh Juvekar as Yash
 Shweta Pendse as Vibhavari
 Abhijeet Chavan
 Rajshri Nikam
 Gautam Jogalekar

Reception

Ratings

References

External links 
 
 Assa Sasar Surekh Baai at Voot

2015 Indian television series debuts
Colors Marathi original programming
Marathi-language television shows
2018 Indian television series endings